The ramp effect (or ramping effect) is a phenomenon involved in drug addiction whereby an addict develops a resistance to a substance, and thus requires increasingly large quantities of that substance to achieve the same effect. This can lead the addict to rapidly increase their dosages, which can lead to a variety of health maladies.

After the ramp effect has begun, it may be very difficult to deprive an addict of their substance, or even to reduce the dosage. Much of drug rehabilitation consists of resisting and reversing the ramping effect.

See also
Drug tolerance

Substance dependence
Drug rehabilitation